Mount Rose may refer to:

Mount Rose (Washington), a summit in the Olympic Mountains
Mount Rose Station, a proposed hotel and casino next to The Summit in Reno, Nevada
Mount Rose (Nevada), a mountain peak in Washoe County, Nevada
Mount Rose Ski Tahoe, a recreational ski resort in Nevada
Mount Rose Summit, a mountain pass on Nevada State Route 431
Mount Rose Weather Observatory, a historic observatory on the summit
Mount Rose Wilderness, protected wilderness area in the Carson Range
Mount Rose (New Jersey), a section of the Rocky Hill Ridge in Mercer County, New Jersey
Mount Rose, New Jersey, a section of Hopewell Township, Mercer County, New Jersey

See also
 Rose Mountain (disambiguation)
 Rose Peak (disambiguation)